Francis Johnson Love (January 23, 1901 – October 1989) was an American politician and Republican U.S. Congressman from West Virginia; born in Cadiz, Harrison County, Ohio, on January 23, 1901.  He attended public schools, then attended Bethany College in Bethany, West Virginia, where he received an A.B. degree in 1924.

Francis Love served as the principal of Warwood High School in Wheeling, West Virginia from 1926 to 1929.  He attended West Virginia University Law School at Morgantown and received his J.D. degree in 1932.  Admitted to the bar the same year, Love commenced the practice of law in Wheeling.

Love was elected as a Republican to the Eightieth Congress (January 3, 1947 – January 3, 1949), but was unsuccessful for reelection in 1948 to the Eighty-first Congress, losing to the Democrat Robert L. Ramsay.  Love also was the Republican nominee again in 1950 and 1952, but he was unable to regain his former seat in the House. He resumed the general practice of law and served as delegate to Republican National Conventions in 1956, 1960, 1964, and 1968. As the Republican candidate for the U.S. Senate in 1966, Love was defeated by Jennings Randolph by a margin of 60 to 40%.  Congressman Love was a resident of Wheeling until his death in October 1989.

See also

List of United States representatives from West Virginia

References

External links

1901 births
1989 deaths
People from Cadiz, Ohio
West Virginia University College of Law alumni
Bethany College (West Virginia) alumni
American school principals
West Virginia lawyers
Politicians from Wheeling, West Virginia
Republican Party members of the United States House of Representatives from West Virginia
20th-century American politicians
Lawyers from Wheeling, West Virginia
20th-century American lawyers